The 2nd constituency of the Hauts-de-Seine is a French legislative constituency in the Hauts-de-Seine département. It elects one Member of Parliament to the National Assembly.

It is represented in the 16th legislature by Francesca Pasquini of EELV.

Description

Hauts-de-Seine's 2nd constituency consists of the south of Colombes and the town of Asnières-sur-Seine to its south. The constituency is part of the western suburbs of Paris contained within a loop of the Seine.

The seat has traditionally supported conservative candidates, however at the 2012 elections it elected a left leaning deputy for the first time.

Historic Representation

Election results

2022

 
 
 

 
 
 
 
 
|-
| colspan="8" bgcolor="#E9E9E9"|
|-

2017

 
 
 
 
 
 
|-
| colspan="8" bgcolor="#E9E9E9"|
|-

2012

 
 
 
 
 
 
 
|-
| colspan="8" bgcolor="#E9E9E9"|
|-

2007

 
 
 
 
 
 
 
 
|-
| colspan="8" bgcolor="#E9E9E9"|
|-

2002

 
 
 
 
 
 
|-
| colspan="8" bgcolor="#E9E9E9"|
|-

1997

 
 
 
 
 
 
 
 
|-
| colspan="8" bgcolor="#E9E9E9"|
|-
 
 

 
 
 
 
 

* RPR dissident

Sources

 Official results of French elections from 1998: 

2